Exelastis atomosa is a moth of the family Pterophoridae. It is known from Cape Verde, Ethiopia, Kenya, Madagascar, South Africa, Eswatini, Tanzania, India, Nepal and Iran.

Adult are small with yellowish brown wings. The forewings are cut into two plumes and hind wings into three.

The larvae are a serious pest of pigeon pea. They damage seeds as well as cause flowers, buds and pods to drop. It also enters into the pod and feeds on developing grains. They are greenish-brown and fringed with short hairs and spines.

References

External links
Species info

Exelastini
Moths of Cape Verde
Moths of Africa
Moths of Asia
Moths of Madagascar
Moths described in 1885